In music, cantabile , an Italian word, means literally "singable" or "songlike". In instrumental music, it is a particular style of playing designed to imitate the human voice. 

For 18th-century composers, cantabile is often synonymous with "cantando" (singing) and indicates a measured tempo and flexible, legato playing. For later composers, particularly in piano music, cantabile is the drawing out of one particular musical line against the accompaniment (compare counterpoint). Felix Mendelssohn's six books of  Songs Without Words are short lyrical piano pieces with song-like melodies written between 1829 and 1845. A modern example is an instrumental by Harry James & His Orchestra, called "Trumpet Blues and Cantabile".

A cantabile movement, or simply a "cantabile", is the first half of a double aria, followed by a cabaletta. The cantabile movement would be slower and more free-form to contrast with the structured and generally faster cabaletta. Louis Spohr subtitled his violin concerto No. 8 "in moda d'una scena cantata," "in the manner of a sung [operatic] scene"; opera arias exerted a strong influence on the "singable" cantabile melodic line in Romantic writing for stringed instruments.

References
Kennedy, Michael, The Oxford Dictionary of Music, Oxford University Press, 1985, p. 123. 
Milsom, David, Theory and Practice in Late Nineteenth-century Violin Performance, Ashgate Publishing, Ltd., 2003, p. 113. 
Warrack, John and West, Ewan, The Oxford Dictionary of Opera, Oxford University Press, 1992, p. 115. 

Italian opera terminology
Classical music styles
Articles containing video clips

da:Cantabile